First day of summer may refer to:

 The beginning of the summer half of the year in the early Germanic calendars
 The beginning of the summer half of the year in medieval and modern Scandinavian culture, observed in April
 First day of summer (Iceland), a public holiday in Iceland
 Start of the meteorological summer, June 1 in the Northern Hemisphere